Geetanjali Lal (born Geetanjali Desai; 6 Nov 1948) is an Indian Kathak dancer and choreographer.

Early life and education
Geetanjali Lal received formal training in Hindustani Classical music by her father, Rajnikant Desai – a well-known vocalist & professor of music and the disciple of Aftab-e-Mosiqui Ustad Faiyaz Khan of Agra Gharana.
She began formal training in Kathak dance at an early age of 6, under the distinguished Kathak danseuse Roshan Kumari.

Geetanjali Lal continued with her formal training in Kathak dance under stalwarts – Pandit Gopi Krishna, Shri Mohan Rao Kallianpurkar and Pandit Devi Lal of Jaipur Gharana.

Career
She held the post of Chief of Repertory and Director of Kathak Kendra from 2009-2012.
She is a top grade artist of Doordarshan and Indian Council for Cultural Relations, New Delhi.

Geetanjali's solo performances have been applauded by audiences wherever she has performed. She is well known for her abhinaya and other features of the Jaipur gharana, like laykaari, intricate rhythmic patterns in her footwork. 
Geetanjali Lal had, ringing out the year 2001, surprised the audience with her imaginative choreography drawing on the tragic earthquake in Kutch, the attack on the twin towers of the World Trade Centre in New York, and the popular TV quiz show ‘Kaun Banega Crorepati' starring Amitabh Bachchan.

Geetanjali also acted in Kashmiri feature film – Shayar-e-Kashmir Mahjoor (1972) by Prabhat Mukherjee – in the lead role, alongside actors Balraj Sahani, Parikshit Sahni, Pran.

Personal life
She was married to Pandit Devi Lal of Jaipur Gharana. 

Kathak dancers Abhimanyu Lal (her son) and Vidha Lal are her disciples.

Awards and honors

 Sangeet Natak Akademi Award by Sangeet Natak Akademi in 2007

Also, she has been awarded the title of “Nritya Sharada”, "Natya Kala Shree”, “Bharat Gaurav”, “Kala Shiromani” and “Kalpana chawala award, "Jjijabai Women Achivers Award", "Acharya Kala Vipanchee"

References

Kathak exponents
Performers of Indian classical dance
Indian classical choreographers
1948 births
Living people
Artists from Ahmedabad
Teachers of Indian classical dance
Recipients of the Sangeet Natak Akademi Award
Indian women choreographers
Indian choreographers
Women educators from Gujarat
Educators from Gujarat
Indian dance teachers
Indian female classical dancers
20th-century Indian dancers
Dancers from Gujarat
20th-century Indian educators
20th-century Indian women artists
Women musicians from Gujarat
20th-century women educators